The West Midlands Regional Women's Football League is at the fifth and sixth levels of the English women's football pyramid, with the seven other Regional Leagues – Eastern, London & SE, Southern, South West, East Mids, North East and North West. The West Midlands Regional Women's Football League feeds directly into the FA Women's Premier League, and lies above the Birmingham Women's Football League, Staffordshire Women's Football League and Worcestershire Women's Football League in the pyramid. The pyramid structure was founded in 1998.

Below the Premier Division the two Division Ones are split geographically with Division One South and Division One North.

2022–23 teams

Premier Division

Division One North

Division One South

External links

West Midlands Regional Women's Football League at FA Full Time

5